Aurelio Iragorri is the name of:

Aurelio Iragorri Hormaza, Colombian politician, father
Aurelio Iragorri Valencia, Colombian politician, son